Alex Barron (born June 11, 1970) is an American former race car driver. He began racing CART FedEx World Series Championship cars in 1998 and made his first Indy Racing League Northern Lights Series (now IndyCar Series) start in 2001.

The 1997 KOOL Toyota Atlantic Champion, moved across to the IRL, where he had trouble finding a regular drive and got his opportunities through injuries to other drivers. However, in 2006, he stepped down a level to race in the Champ Car Atlantic Championship, and then returned to IRL in 2007. After racing in the 2008 Rolex 24 at Daytona, Barron stopped racing at an international level.

Racing career

Early years
Barron was born in San Diego, California.  In 1996, the opportunity for him to move up to US National Formula Ford 2000 came with the DSTP Team. This proved to be a steep learning curve from kart to open wheel race car, for the young racer. However, a podium, a fastest lap and six top ten finishes won him to chance to race in Toyota Atlantic the following season.

Barron in his rookie season in the KOOL Toyota Atlantic series, surprised everyone, including his team, Lynx Racing by dominating and winning the 1997 championship, taking five victories along the way. With four pole positions, six fastest laps and nine top three finishes, he would also win the “Rookie of the Year” award.

Part of his prize for winning the Championship was a test with the Arciero-Wells Racing CART team.  During his test, he was quickly matching the speed of their regular driver, Max Papis.  Arciero-Wells were so impressed with him, they offered a testing contract. Following the retirement of Juan Manuel Fangio II, the All American Racers Team and their boss, Dan Gurney, wanted a young American driver who could develop with the team, and Barron got the call.

In just 24 races, 12 races in both the Formula Ford 2000 and Toyota Atlantic, Barron made the jump from racing karts to CART.

Indycars

Alex's time with Gurney and his AAR team was a troubled by an uncompetitive combination of the chassis (they used both Eagle and Reynard chassis), Toyota engines and Goodyear tyres.  Midway through his second season (1999) with AAR, he was let go. Later that season, he was signed by Marlboro Team Penske to race in two 500 mile events. Once again he found himself in an uncompetitive combination, this time it was a Penske PC27B-99 with Mercedes engines and Goodyears.

It was not until the second half of 2000 season that Barron reappeared in CART, running with Dale Coyne Racing. The following season, he raced just the final two races for Arciero-Blair Racing. During these races, Alex led both, before retiring with problems the Ford Cosworth engines both times.

In 2002, Barron switched to the IRL, signing for Blair Racing, where he finish fourth in Indianapolis 500, co-winning the Rookie of the Year. Later that season, he would earn the first of his two IndyCar Series wins, the 2002 Firestone Indy 200 at Nashville Speedway. Sadly, Blair Racing would fold at the end of the season, leaving Barron without a full-time drive for 2003. In 2003, Barron drove for three teams. After replacing the injured Gil de Ferran for a one-off appearance for Marlboro Team Penske, he raced for Mo Nunn Racing, filling in for the injured Felipe Giaffone. It was with Mo Nunn that Barron scored his second IRL victory, in the 2003 Firestone Indy 400 at Michigan International Speedway. For the final three races of that season, Eddie Cheever hired Barron to drive for his Red Bull Cheever Racing outfit, instead of Buddy Rice. In his first race for Cheever, he gave the team their best finish of the season, seventh place at the Chicagoland Speedway.
 

In 2004 and 2005 he drove for Eddie Cheever's Red Bull Cheever Racing. Red Bull sponsorship of the team ended for 2006, leaving Alex unable to remain with the team - he instead took a step backward, returning to the Champ Car Atlantic Championship for 2006 with Polestar Racing Group where he finished 14th in points. Early that year he raced twice for alongside Michael McDowell for Playboy/Uniden Racing, with a best finish of sixth in the Rolex 24 At Daytona, the pair aided by Memo Gidley. Greg Beck signed him to run races part-time in the IndyCar Series for the 2007 season for CURB/Agajanian/Beck Motorsports. He competed in three races, including the Indy 500. Barron would return to Daytona for the 2008 Rolex 24, with Southard Motorsport, only to retire from the race. He would not race internationally again.

He now runs a kart business.

Racing record

Career highlights

Complete 24 Hours of Daytona results

American open wheel racing results
(key)

CART

IndyCar Series

Indianapolis 500

References

External links
Photo sequence of 2005 Chicagoland crash with Ryan Briscoe.

Living people
Atlantic Championship drivers
Champ Car drivers
Indianapolis 500 drivers
Indianapolis 500 Rookies of the Year
IndyCar Series drivers
Racing drivers from San Diego
24 Hours of Daytona drivers
Rolex Sports Car Series drivers
1970 births
Team Penske drivers
GT World Challenge America drivers
Mo Nunn Racing drivers
Cheever Racing drivers
Arrow McLaren SP drivers
Dale Coyne Racing drivers